Furr is a 2008 album by Blitzen Trapper.

Furr may also refer to:

People
Christian Furr (born 1966), English painter
David Furr, American theatre and television actor
George Furr (1885–1967), English footballer
Grover Furr (born 1944), American professor and author
Harry Furr (1887–1971), English footballer
Joel Furr (b. 1967), American writer and software trainer
Nyman Furr (1949–2007), American musician 
Roy Furr (1904–1975), founder of Furr's Cafeterias and supermarkets
Vic Furr (1897–1976), English footballer
Willie Furr (1891–1975), English footballer
Paula White (née Furr, born 1966), American preacher
Lucy Furr, ring name  of Daffney (Shannon Claire Spruill, born 1975), American wrestler

Other uses
Furr's, a chain of restaurants in the United States
Furr High School, in Houston, Texas, U.S.
Felina Furr, a fictional character in comic Captain Carrot and His Amazing Zoo Crew!
 "Furr", a song by Pink Guy from the 2017 album Pink Season

See also

Fur (disambiguation)
Furry (disambiguation)